The 2021–22 Cymru South season (also known as the 2021–22 JD Cymru South season for sponsorship reasons) was the third season of the second-tier Southern region football in Welsh football pyramid.  Teams will play each other twice on a home and away basis.

Swansea University were the defending champions from the 2019–20 season, following the curtailment of the 2020–21 season.

Pre-season favourites Ammanford AFC endured a season of struggle, with a three way title race for much of the season between Briton Ferry, Pontypridd Town AFC, and Llantwit Major AFC. After all three clubs lead at some point, Llantwit Major put together an outstanding finish to the season, winning 11 games out of 12 to lift the trophy with a game to spare. Pontypridd finished 2nd, and were promoted after Llantwit were controversially denied a Tier 1 license.

Teams
The league consists of 16 clubs.

Stadia and Locations

Source: Cymru South Ground Information

Personnel and kits

Managerial changes

League table

Results

Season statistics

Top scorers

Monthly awards

Fair Play award
The winner for each respective division's FAW Fair Play Table was to be given £1,000 prize money and the FAW Fair Play Trophy.

The winners of the Nationwide Building Society Fair Play Award for the 2021-2022 Cymru South season are Swansea University

External links
Football Association of Wales
Cymru South Football

References

2021–22 in Welsh football
Cymru South seasons
Wales